Columba Domínguez Alarid (March 4, 1929 – August 13, 2014) was a Mexican actress, singer, and painter. She is remembered particularly for her performance in the film Pueblerina (1949).

Biography

Early life
Columba Domínguez Alarid was born on March 4, 1929, in Guaymas, Sonora, Mexico. She moved to Mexico City with her family when she was very young. While attending a party with one of her sisters, she was discovered by the Mexican film director Emilio Fernández, who started her acting career with small roles in films such as La perla (1945) and Río Escondido (1947).

Career
In 1948, Fernandez gave her the antagonistic role in the film Maclovia (1948), with María Félix. Her performance was praised by critics and, thanks to this film, Fernández entrusted with the leading role that would become her best film: Pueblerina (1948). Thanks to this movie Columba rose to stardom rapidly and became known worldwide to be presented at the Karlovy Vary International Film Festival. In that same year she participated in La Malquerida, with Dolores del Río and Pedro Armendáriz.

 
Following the success of Pueblerina, Columba was contracted in Italy to appear in the film L'Edera (1950). That same year, she filmed Un día de vida (1952), which went unnoticed in Mexico, but became a huge success in the former Yugoslavia.

Encased in native roles, Columba separates professionally from Fernandez in 1952, which allowed them to become one first figure and work under the orders of other filmmakers, such as Luis Buñuel (with whom she worked in El río y la muerte (1955)), Fernando Méndez (director of the cult film Ladrón de cadáveres (1957), considered one of the best Mexican horror  films) and Ismael Rodriguez (who took her to star in two masterpieces: Los Hermanos de Hierro (1961) and Ánimas Trujano (1962), with the Japanese actor Toshiro Mifune), among others. In 1962 she participated in El tejedor de milagros, a film that represented Latin America in the IX Berlin Film Festival. Columba also made the first official nude in the Mexican Cinema in the film La virtud desnuda. (1956).

In 1961, she recorded an LP record titled La voz dulce y mexicana de Columba Domínguez (The Sweet, Mexican Voice of Columba Domínguez) for the RCA Víctor label, with orchestral arrangements by Mario Ruiz Armengol and Chucho Ferrer. The album has ten tracks and was reissued in digital format by Sony Music in 2012.

On television, Domínguez performed in telenovelas like La tormenta (1967) and El carruaje (1972). Her last television appearance was in Aprendiendo a amar (1979).

After her retirement in 1987, Columba devoted herself to dance, humanistic art, painting and piano. In 2008, after more than 20 years of retirement from cinema, the Mexican director Roberto Fiesco returned her to the screen in the short film Paloma. That same year, Dominguez was honored by the International Film Festival de la Frontera, in Ciudad Juarez, at which some of the most representative titles in which she performed were shown. In 2010, Domínguez made special appearances in the films La cebra and Borrar la memoria, and in 2012 she appeared in the film El último trago.

In May 2013, Columba Domínguez was honored with the Golden Ariel Award for her contributions to the Mexican film industry.

Personal life
In 1945, Domínguez was discovered by the famous Mexican film director Emilio Fernandez, who launched her career in film. She and Fernandez began a friendly relationship, which soon led to romance, and Columba later claimed that this resulted in their secret marriage. The couple had a daughter, Jacaranda, born in 1952. Personal differences, and infidelities by Fernández, prompted Domínguez to leave him in 1952, taking their daughter with her.

A tragic event marred Domínguez' life when, in 1978, her daughter Jacaranda died after falling from the fourth floor of a building, in circumstances that were never clarified.

Domínguez and Fernández resumed their relationship several times. She was with him in his last days, despite their having been apart many years, and she did not leave the hospital room until his body was removed. In March 1987 she wrote a book titled Emilio, the Indian that I love which was dedicated to her great love.

After Fernández' death in 1986, a dispute over his will erupted, particularly concerning his stunning "fortress" home in the neighborhood of Coyoacan, in the south of Mexico City. Emilio died intestate, and his only surviving daughter, the writer Adela Fernandez y Fernandez, was automatically named the sole heir to the exclusion of Domínguez, who claimed property rights. According to Domínguez, Adela was not a biological daughter of Emilio, and he had never legally adopted her.<ref>{{YouTube|AEiFw-MuwfY|La historia detras del mito: Emilio "El Indio" Fernández}}</ref> These details, and the legal situation, were never clarified as Adela died in 2013.

Her very Mexican beauty was portrayed in paintings by famous artists like Miguel Covarrubias, Jesús Guerrero Galván and Diego Rivera.

Death
Columba Domínguez died on August 13, 2014, in the Hospital Ángeles Santelena in Mexico City, as a result of a heart attack, after being hospitalized for several days due to complications from pneumonia. She was entombed at the Mausoleos del Ángel Graveyard, in Mexico City.

Selected filmography

FeaturesLa Perla (1947)Río Escondido (1948)Maclovia (1948)Pueblerina (1949)The Unloved Woman (1949)L'edera (1950)Un día de vida (1951)La Bienamada (1952)Reportaje (1953)Women Who Work (1953)Historia de un abrigo de mink (1953)El río y la muerte (1957)Esposas infieles (1956)La Virtud Desnuda (1956)Ladrón de Cadáveres (1957)Cabaret Trágico (1958)Pan, amor...y Andalucía (1959)Los hermanos Del Hierro (1961)Ánimas Trujano (1962)Pueblito (1962)El tejedor de milagros (1962)Paloma herída (1963)La Loba (1965)Las Momias de Guanajuato (TV) (1966)La tormenta (TV) (1967)Mi niño Tizoc (1972)Los Ricos Tambien Lloran (TV) (1979)Aprendiendo a Amar (TV) (1979)Una gallina muy ponedora (1982)Paloma (2008)La Cebra (2010)Borrar la Memoria (2010)El último trago (2012)Ramona (2014)

DiscographyLa voz dulce y mexicana de Columba Domínguez'' (RCA Víctor, 1961)
Side one:
 "La pajarera"
 "Pregones de México"
 "Nunca"
 "Se me hizo fácil"
 "Dime si me quieres"
Side two:
 "Xochimilco"
 "Te amaré vida mía"
 "Nunca, nunca, nunca"
 "Paloma mensajera"
 "La barca de Guaymas"

References

External links
 
 
 Columba Domínguez en Cine Mexicano en ITESM
 

Mexican film actresses
Mexican telenovela actresses
Mexican television actresses
1929 births
2014 deaths
Ariel Award winners
Golden Age of Mexican cinema
Golden Ariel Award winners
Bolero singers
Ranchera singers
Mexican artists' models
RCA Records artists
People from Guaymas
Actresses from Sonora
Singers from Sonora
20th-century Mexican actresses
21st-century Mexican actresses
20th-century Mexican women singers
21st-century Mexican women singers